Khujand International Airport  is an airport serving Khujand, the second-largest city in Tajikistan. Khujand was formerly known as Leninabad (during the Soviet era); hence the IATA code LBD. It is located out of the city, in the nearby town of Chkalovsk.

Facilities
The airport resides at an elevation of 442 m above mean sea level. It has one runway designated 08/26 with an asphalt surface measuring 3,200 x 50 m.

Airlines and destinations

See also 
Transport in Tajikistan
List of the busiest airports in the former USSR

References

External links
 
 

Airport
Airports in Tajikistan
Sughd Region